The 2015 Portland Timbers season was the 5th season for the Portland Timbers in Major League Soccer (MLS), the top flight professional soccer league in the United States and Canada this season resulted in the Timbers winning the 2015 MLS Cup.

Background

Competitions

Major League Soccer

Preseason

Desert Friendlies

Simple™ Invitational

MLS regular season

MLS Cup Playoffs

Standings

Western Conference standings

Overall standings

U.S. Open Cup

Cascadia Cup

The Cascadia Cup is a trophy that was created in 2004 by supporters of the Portland Timbers, Seattle Sounders FC and Vancouver Whitecaps FC. It is awarded to the club with the best record in league games versus the other participants.

Friendlies
No Friendlies in 2015.

Club

Kits

Executive staff

Coaching staff

Squad

Roster and Statistics

All players contracted to the club during the season included.

Goalkeeper stats

Player movement

Transfers in

Loans in

Loans out

Transfers out

2015 MLS SuperDraft picks

References

Portland Timbers
Portland Timbers
Portland Timbers
2015
MLS Cup champion seasons
Port